Clennyson do Nascimento or simply Xaves (born February 27, 1986 in Balsas), is a Brazilian defensive midfielder for Ponte Preta.

Made professional debut for Paraná in a 3-0 home win over Grêmio in the Campeonato Brasileiro on May 13, 2007.

Contract
Atlético Mineiro (Loan 25 July 2007 to 25 July 2008)
Desportivo-SP 23 July 2007 to 22 July 2012

External links

zerozero.pt 

1986 births
Living people
Brazilian footballers
Paraná Clube players
Campeonato Brasileiro Série A players
Clube Atlético Mineiro players
Associação Atlética Ponte Preta players
Desportivo Brasil players
Association football midfielders